Ángel Hidalgo Portillo (born 27 April 1998) is a Spanish professional golfer and European Tour player. He won the 2021 German Challenge on the Challenge Tour.

Amateur career
Hidalgo was born in Marbella, Andalusia, and played golf at Real Club de Golf Guadalmina, encouraged by his grandfather and father, also named Ángel and a golf professional.

Hidalgo had a successful amateur career, winning the Spanish Amateur in 2016 and 2018. He was part of the Spanish National Team and represented his country at the European Amateur Team Championship three times, winning the event in 2017. 

In 2018, he played for Europe in the Bonallack Trophy in Qatar and at the St Andrews Trophy in Finland, where Hidalgo, who was three-down after five holes in his match against Todd Clements, clawed his way to victory helping the Continent of Europe claim the trophy for the first time since 2012 and for the sixth time in the match's history.

Hidalgo won the bronze for Spain at the 2018 Eisenhower Trophy in Ireland, together with Alejandro del Rey and Victor Pastor.

Professional career
Hidalgo turned professional in 2018 and started playing on the Alps Tour and the Challenge Tour in 2019.

On the Alps Tour, he was runner-up at the 2020 Toscana Alps Open, one stroke behind Matteo Manassero, before winning the Ein Bay Open and the Memorial Giorgio Bordoni in 2021.

In 2021, he was 3rd at the Sydbank Esbjerg Challenge, ahead of earning his first Challenge Tour title at the 2021 Big Green Egg German Challenge, finishing two strokes clear of Lukas Nemecz and compatriot Santiago Tarrío.

Playing mainly on the European Tour in 2022, he shot a 63 in the opening round of the Estrella Damm N.A. Andalucía Masters at Valderrama to share the lead. He carded eight birdies, and narrowly failed to chip in for another on his final hole which would have seen him equal Bernhard Langer's 28-year-old course record. He finished solo 4th in the tournament, to finish 91st in the season rankings and secure his card for 2023.

Amateur wins
2016 Campeonato de Espana Amateur, Campeonato Internacional de Andalucia U25, Memorial Norberto Goizueta, Campeonato Internacional de Espana U18, Copa Nacional Puerta de Hierro
2017 Campeonato Absoluto de las Comunidad Valenciana, Memorial Norberto Goizueta
2018 Copa de Andalucia, Campeonato de Espana Amateur

Source:

Professional wins (3)

Challenge Tour wins (1)

Alps Tour wins (2)

Team appearances
Amateur
European Amateur Team Championship (representing Spain): 2016, 2017 (winners), 2018
Bonallack Trophy (representing Europe): 2018
St Andrews Trophy (representing the Continent of Europe): 2018 (winners)
Eisenhower Trophy (representing Spain): 2018

References

External links

Spanish male golfers
People from Marbella
Sportspeople from the Province of Málaga
1998 births
Living people
21st-century Spanish people